Stephanie Ann D'Abruzzo (born December 7, 1971) is an American actress, puppeteer and singer. She has performed various Muppets in the TV program Sesame Street. She held starring roles on Oobi and The Book of Pooh. She was one of the original cast members of the stage musical Avenue Q, receiving a nomination for the 2004 Best Actress in a Musical.

Early life
D'Abruzzo was born in Pittsburgh, Pennsylvania, on December 7, 1971, and grew up in McMurray, a Pittsburgh suburb she has described as a "plastic bubble kind of town." She graduated from Peters Township High School in 1989 and attended the Pennsylvania Governor's School for the Arts, a summer program for gifted high school students.

D'Abruzzo is a 1993 graduate of the Radio/Television/Film program at Northwestern University. At the university's Communications Residential College (CRC), she could often be caught watching (and, as it turns out, studying) Sesame Street. She had a large collection of Muppet recordings, which she compiled into a mixtape that she auctioned off for dorm fundraisers.

Eventually, D'Abruzzo began to consider puppetry as a career, in part as a solution to finding acting roles after she "gained more than the Freshman 15 and [got] a bad perm." D'Abruzzo's production of a puppet television show called Freeform won the National College Emmy award for comedy.

D'Abruzzo's other roles at Northwestern included Mildred in the short film The Ballad of Hank and Mildred and as herself in The Glance. While in college, she also performed with a campus improvisational comedy troupe.

Career

D'Abruzzo has spent much of her career performing as a puppeteer in children's television, but she is known for originating the roles of single schoolteacher Kate Monster and sultry chanteuse Lucy the Slut in 2003 in the Broadway musical Avenue Q. She garnered acclaim for her performance of the dual role, including a nomination for the 2004 Tony Award for Best Actress in a Musical, a Drama Desk nomination, the Theatre World Award, and the 2003–2004 Outer Critics Circle Special Ensemble Award.

Other stage credits include I Love You Because (Off-Broadway) (2006), If You Give A Mouse A Cookie (Off-Broadway, TheaterworksUSA, 2006), Carnival (for City Center Encores!, 2002), Kiss and Makeup (New York City Fringe Festival, 2007), and Austentatious (New York Musical Theatre Festival) in 2007.

D'Abruzzo has performed in developmental readings of Avenue Q, I Love You Because, Oh, What a Lovely War! (2005), The $trip, The Medium at Large, and The Green Room. She has also been featured in several concerts and benefits, including Skitch Henderson's New Faces of 2004 at Carnegie Hall, Encores! 10th Anniversary Bash, Chess (for the Actors' Fund, 2003), Children and Art: Stephen Sondheim's 75th Birthday Gala (2005), and Stephen Sondheim's 75th: The Concert (at the Hollywood Bowl, 2005).

D'Abruzzo appears on the original cast recordings of Avenue Q and I Love You Because and performs the parts of "Sheldon" and "Deb" on the studio recording of Finding Nemo – The Musical, a musical production performed several times each day at Disney's Animal Kingdom.

She is one of the performers included in the documentary ShowBusiness: The Road to Broadway (2007), which chronicles the 2003–2004 Broadway season.

In May 2005, D'Abruzzo made her solo cabaret debut at the New York City jazz club Birdland.

Television
Since 1993, D'Abruzzo has performed as various Muppets in Sesame Street, including a notable performance singing with R.E.M. in a new version of their song "Shiny Happy People" called "Furry Happy Monsters". From 2000 to 2005, she appeared as Uma and Inka on the Noggin series Oobi. D'Abruzzo worked on Oobi along with her husband, Craig Shemin, who was part of the show's writing staff.

Her other puppeteering and voice work includes appearances in Sheep in the Big City, The Book of Pooh, The Wubbulous World of Dr. Seuss (1997), and Jack's Big Music Show, along with various commercials and promos. She guest starred in a musical episode of Scrubs titled "My Musical", as a patient with a mysterious ailment that caused her to interpret speech as Broadway-esque song and dance numbers. She sang in five of the nine songs. Four of the episode's songs were co-written by Avenue Q composers Robert Lopez and Jeff Marx. She later appeared in a cameo in episode "My Finale", as series protagonist J.D. leaves Sacred Heart for the final time.

D'Abruzzo performed Prairie Dawn on Sesame Street season 46, following the retirement of Prairie Dawn's original performer, Fran Brill, in 2015.

D’Abruzzo voiced Kimmy’s long-lost backpack, Jan S. Port, in Season 4, episode 6 of the Unbreakable Kimmy Schmidt ("Kimmy Meets an Old Friend"). She reprised her role in the show's interactive film.

Personal life
She is married to Craig Shemin, a writer and producer and board member of the Jim Henson Legacy. They 
married on September 17, 1995, and live in New York City.

Filmography
 The Varsity Cafe (TV, 1990) - Frieda
 Sesame Street (1993–present) - Prairie Dawn (Since 2016), Elizabeth, Mrs. Crustworthy (Since 2016), Lulu, Curly Bear, Googel, Additional Muppets
 The Puzzle Place (1995) - Jody Silver and Pink Piece Police (Season 2)
 The Wubbulous World of Dr. Seuss (TV, 1996) - Little Cat B, Annie DeLoo, Max the Dog, Jane Kangaroo, Pam-I-Am, Sue Snue, Sarah Hall-Small, Additional Muppets
 Elmo's World (1998) - Curly Bear, Elizabeth, Pillow, Diva D'Abruzzo, Additional Muppets
 The Adventures of Elmo in Grouchland (1999)  - Grizzy, Pestie
 Elmo's World: The Wild Wild West (2001) - Googel (Monster Clubhouse segment only)
Scrubs (2001) - Patti (6.06, 8.19), AM Muppet (Ex Ray- 8.05)
 The Book of Pooh (TV, 2001–2003)  - Kessie
 Jack's Big Music Show (2005) - Gertrude the Groundhog, Scat Cat
Bert and Ernie's Great Adventures (2006-2013) Heidi, Clarice the Cow, Lady Lulu Quackerville, Lily, Bertina, Ostrich Lady, Ostrich Lady
Abby's Flying Fairy School (2009) - Super Fairy
Cookie's Crumby Pictures (2013) - Iffy, M, Princess Parfaita, Sally
Scooby-Doo! Adventures: The Mystery Map (2013) - Velma Dinkley and Shirley
 Helpsters - Cody (2019–present)
 Oobi (2000–2005) - Uma, Inka
Julie's Greenroom (2017) - Peri
The Not-Too-Late Show with Elmo (2020) - Mae, Praise Dawn
 Donkey Hodie (TV, 2021–present) - Duck Duck, Harriett Elizabeth Cow
Furry Friends Forever: Elmo Gets a Puppy (2021) - Mae

References

External links
 The official website of Stephanie D’Abruzzo
 
 
 Stephanie D'Abruzzo at the Internet Off-Broadway Database
 Stephanie D'Abruzzo and John Tartaglia - Downstage Center interview at American Theatre Wing.org
 THE Q INTERVIEW: Kate Monster interviews Stephanie
 Stephanie D'Abruzzo video interview parts 1 and 2 at the Scrubs Production Blog
 BroadwayWorld.com interview with Stephanie D'Abruzzo, June 13, 2007

1971 births
Living people
Actresses from Pittsburgh
American stage actresses
American musical theatre actresses
American video game actresses
American voice actresses
American puppeteers
Sesame Street Muppeteers
Theatre World Award winners
Northwestern University School of Communication alumni
20th-century American actresses
20th-century American singers
20th-century American women singers
21st-century American actresses
21st-century American singers
21st-century American women singers
Muppet performers
American people of Italian descent